"Hijos del pueblo" is a Spanish song originating from the labor movement, primarily inspired by anarcho-syndicalism.

Allegedly, this song was made by the a journalist from Alicante, Rafael Carratalá Ramos.

It was shared with the public in 1885 for the "Revolutionary Music" section of the first socialist meeting organised by the 'Centre d'Amics' in Reus , belonging to the First International.

Versions 

The song has 3 lyrics, as it was sang popularly, even some versions may differ. See Chinese whispers

The first known version is the original one from 1885, strongly focused on organising for labour rights.

The second one was recorded during the Spanish Civil War by the Orfeó Català under the instructions of Francisco Pujol., understandably a lot of the focus is shifted towards antifascism.

The third one is a version named Himno anarquista ( Anarchist Anthem ) o Salud proletarios ( Long Live the Proletariat), with undertones of a camping song.

Version for the centenary of the  CNT 

To celebrate the centenary of the CNT, it was proposed to make a cover with modern sound equipment of A las barricadas  and Hijos del pueblo.

To get the music sheet, the  Fundación de Estudios Libertarios Anselmo Lorenzo was contacted with hopes that the sheets were in their archives.
However they were informed that even if they were somewhere, they would be untraceable, probably lost or destroyed after the end of the Civil War.

Afterwards, the CNT contacted the newspaper Tierra y Libertad, discovering that they in fact had the music sheets.

After months of work composing, writing, gathering musicians and singers the 14th of November 2009 the recording took place in the 'Conservatorio de Música Juan Crisóstomo de Arriaga', in  Bilbao, organised by Luís Antonio Gamarra.

Lyrics

Related 
 A las barricadas

References

External links 
 Hijos del pueblo (versión del centenario de la CNT), en YouTube
 Hijos del pueblo. El himno anarquista compuesto por un marxista 

Anarchist songs
Spanish-language songs
Songs of the Spanish Civil War
Anarchism in Spain